The women's shot put at the 2012 European Athletics Championships was held at the Helsinki Olympic Stadium on 28 and 29 June.

Medalists

Records

Schedule

Results

Qualification
Qualification: Qualification Performance 17.40 (Q) or at least 12 best performers advance to the final

Final

References

Qualification Results
Final Results

Shot put
Shot put at the European Athletics Championships
2012 in women's athletics